Bossuet is a French surname. Notable people with the surname include:

 Jacques-Bénigne Bossuet (1627–1704), French bishop and theologian, uncle of Louis
 Louis Bossuet (1663–1742), French parliamentarian, nephew of Jacques-Bénigne

See also
 Bossut, surname
 Musée Bossuet, art and history museum located in Meaux, France

French-language surnames